{{Infobox raga
| name          = Raga Jhinjhoti 
| image_name    =
| image_alt     =
| thaat         = Khamaj
| type          = Shadav-Sampurna Vakra 
| time          = 2nd Prahar of the night 
| season        =
| arohana       = 
| avarohana     = 
| vadi          = 
| samavadi      = 
| pakad         = 
| chalan        = 
| synonym       = 
| equivalent    = Khambavati
| similar       =
}}Jhinjhoti is a Hindustani classical raga from the Khamaj Thaat. This is a light and playful raga.

TheoryAarohana AvarohaPakad / ChalanVadiGaSamavadi'Ni

Raga description

This is a light and playful Raga, apt for instrumental music. In this Raga mostly light mood Bandishs are rendered.

Songs in this Raga
A famous rendition of this raga is Abdul Karim Khan's Thumri "Piya Bin Nahi Aavat Chain" which Bhimsen Joshi had heard as a child and which left a lasting impression on him.Gulon mein rang bhare,'' a ghazal by Faiz Ahmad Faiz , sung by Mehdi Hassan, is set to Jhinjhoti.

References

Hindustani ragas